Thymallus is a genus of freshwater fish in the salmon family Salmonidae; it is the only genus of subfamily Thymallinae. The type species is Thymallus thymallus, the grayling. The species in the genus are generically called graylings, but without qualification this also refers specifically to T. thymallus.

Distribution
The fishes of this genus are native to the northern parts of the Palearctic and Nearctic realms, ranging from the United Kingdom and northern Europe across Eurasia to Siberia, as well as northern North America.  T. thymallus, the grayling, is widespread in Europe, and T. arcticus, the Arctic grayling, is widespread throughout Eurasia east of the Ural Mountains and in the Nearctic. The other species have more localized ranges in northern Asia.

Appearance
Thymallus species are distinguished from other members of the salmon family by their larger scales, their small mouths with teeth on the maxillary bone, and most striking of all, their showy, sail-like dorsal fins. This fin is longer in males and highly colourful, with spots of red, orange, purple or green. The body is also colourful; the dorsal surface is a dark purplish to bluish black or gray, grading to dark blue or silver gray on the flanks and gray or white on the belly. The body is further decorated with a smattering of small dark spots; these are much more numerous in juveniles.

T. thymallus, while somewhat shorter -  - may weigh significantly more, . The fishes of this genus may live for 18 years or more.

Ecology and reproduction
These fishes require cool, well-oxygenated water, preferably with a swift current; they are found in large, sandy- or gravel-bottomed rivers and lakes, but T. thymallus may occasionally be found in brackish conditions. Generally omnivorous, they feed primarily on crustaceans, insects, and zooplankton.

The grayling species, typically for salmonids, spawn in rivers and do not guard their brood, although they do conceal their eggs in silt. The spawning behavior of the Arctic grayling may be typical for the genus Thymallus.

As they are highly sensitive to changes in water quality, Thymallus fishes may be considered indicator species; T. arcticus has largely disappeared from the Great Lakes Basin.

Human use

Due to their agreeable taste and attractive form, the grayling species are valued as food and game fishes, and they are occasionally seen in public aquaria. The most economically important of these fishes, for which fisheries and aquaculture operations exist, are the grayling (T. thymallus) and the Arctic grayling (T. arcticus).

Name
The name of the genus Thymallus first given to grayling (T. thymallus) described in the 1758 edition of Systema Naturae by Swedish zoologist Carl Linnaeus originates from the 
faint smell of the herb thyme, which emanates from the flesh.   Thymallus derives from the Greek θύμαλλος, "thyme smell".

Species 
According to FishBase,  14 species are placed in this genus. However, views differ on their taxonomic rank.
 Thymallus arcticus (Pallas, 1776) - Arctic grayling
 Thymallus baicalensis Dybowski, 1874 - Baikal black grayling
 Thymallus brevipinnis Svetovidov (ru), 1931 - Baikal white grayling
 Thymallus brevirostris Kessler, 1879 - Mongolian grayling
 Thymallus burejensis Antonov, 2004
 Thymallus flavomaculatus Knizhin, Antonov & Weiss, 2006 - yellow-spotted grayling
 Thymallus grubii Dybowski, 1869 - Amur grayling
Thymallus mertensii Valenciennes, 1848
 Thymallus nigrescens Dorogostaisky, 1923 - Kosogol grayling
 Thymallus pallasii Valenciennes, 1848  - East Siberian grayling
 Thymallus svetovidovi Knizhin & Weiss, 2009 - Upper Yenisei grayling
 Thymallus thymallus (Linnaeus, 1758) - grayling
 Thymallus tugarinae Knizhin, Antonov, Safronov & Weiss, 2007  - Lower Amur grayling 
 Thymallus yaluensis T. Mori, 1928

Modern reviews and the Catalog of Fishes  also list additional species including Thymallus nikolskyi , Thymallus baicalolenensis  and Thymallus ligericus . An old controversy exists over the status of Baikal black vs white graylings, T. baicalensis and T. brevipinnis. Modern research supports the view that they are not separate taxa, but alternative ecological forms of T. baicalensis.

References

 
Extant Pleistocene first appearances
Ray-finned fish genera
Holarctic fauna